Hațeg is a town in Hunedoara County, Romania with a population of 9,340. Three villages are administered by the town: Nălațvad (Nalácvád), Silvașu de Jos (Alsószilvás), and Silvașu de Sus (Felsőszilvás). It is situated in the historical region of Transylvania.

History 
In 1765, while part of the Habsburg controlled Principality of Transylvania, the settlement was completely militarised and integrated into the Second Border Company of the First Border Regiment from Orlat, until 1851, when that unit was disbanded.

Geology 
Țara Hațegului (the Hațeg Country) is the region around the town of Hațeg.  The fossils found in the Hațeg area span over 300 million years of Earth's geologic history, showing tropical coral reefs and volcanic island in the Tethys Sea, dinosaurs, primitive mammals, birds, and flying reptiles (such as Hatzegopteryx, which was named for the region).

Hațeg Island was an island during the Cretaceous Period where a dwarf species of sauropod dinosaur, Magyarosaurus dacus, lived until their extinction at the end of the Cretaceous. Baron Franz Nopcsa published articles about these Mesozoic-era archosaurs on Hațeg Island.  His studies led to his theory of insular dwarfism, the notion that "limited resources" on small islands can lead to a downsizing of the indigenous vertebrate animals.

Demographics 

According to the first ethnic census of 1850, the town had 1,194 inhabitants, 915 of them being Romanian, 92 Roma, 77 Hungarian, 62 German (more specifically Transylvanian Saxons), and 48 of other ethnicities. According to the 2011 census, Hațeg had 9,685 inhabitants, of which 93.15% were Romanians, 1.6% Hungarians, 1,1% of other ethnicities and unknown for 4,14% of the population.

Natives 
 Nicholas Deak
 Chike Onyejekwe
 Nneka Onyejekwe

Gallery

See also 
 Hateg Country Dinosaur Geopark

References

External links 

 
 Hațeg City Hall Official Site 

Towns in Romania
Populated places in Hunedoara County
Localities in Transylvania
Țara Hațegului
Global Geoparks Network members
Geoparks in Romania